Stenoscelida (meaning "narrow hind leg") is a genus of proterochampsid archosauriforms from the Late Triassic Santa Maria Supersequence (Paraná Basin) of Rio Grande do Sul, Brazil. The genus contains a single species, S. aurantiacus, known from a right hind limb.

Discovery and naming
The holotype specimen, CAPPA/UFSM 0293, was found at the Exaeretodon sub-Assemblage Zone (Hyperodapedon Assemblage Zone) of the Santa Maria Supersequence (lower Candelaria Sequence) in the Paraná Basin. This locality is dated to the late Carnian/early Norian ages of the upper Triassic period, around 228 million years old. It consists of a complete, articulated right hind limb.

In 2022, Stenoscelida aurantiacus was described as a new genus and species of proterochampsid archosauriforms by Rodrigo T. Müller, Mauricio S. Garcia, and André O. Fonseca based on these remains. The generic name, "Stenoscelida ", is derived from the Greek words "στενός", meaning "narrow", and "σκέλος" meaning "hind leg", in reference to the morphology of the holotype remains. The specific name, "aurantiacus", means "orange" in Latin, in reference to the color of the sediments of the type locality.

Description

Based on the known fossil remains, Stenoscelida would have been smaller than the related Pseudochampsa and Proterochampsa from Argentina.

Classification 
In their phylogenetic analyses, Müller, Garcia & Fonseca (2022) recovered Stenoscelida as a member of the Proterochampsidae clade within Proterochampsia, as the sister taxon to Tropidosuchus, Cerritosaurus, Gualosuchus, and Proterochampsa spp. The cladogram below displays the results of their phylogenetic analyses.

References

Late Triassic reptiles of South America
Fossil taxa described in 2022
Proterochampsians
Triassic Brazil
Fossils of Brazil
Santa Maria Formation